Barnes County is a county in the U.S. state of North Dakota. As of the 2020 census, the population was 10,853. Its county seat is Valley City.

In 1872, the Dakota Territory legislature authorized Burbank County (named for governor John A. Burbank); in 1874 they renamed it Barnes County, for Alanson H. Barnes (1818–1890), an associate justice of the Territorial Court. It was organized at Valley City on January 6, 1879.

Geography

The Sheyenne River flows southerly through the central part of Barnes County. The county terrain consists of rolling hills, carved with drainages, and dotted with lakes and ponds. The area is largely devoted to agriculture. The terrain slopes to the south and east; its highest point is on its upper west boundary line, at 1,535' (468m) ASL.

Major highways

Adjacent counties

 Griggs County – north
 Steele County – northeast
 Cass County – east
 Ransom County – southeast
 LaMoure County – southwest
 Stutsman County – west

Protected areas

 Clausen Springs Recreation Area
 Clausen Springs State Game Management Area
 Hobart Lake National Wildlife Refuge
 Koldak State Game Management Area
 Riparian Restoration Interpretative Site
 Stoney Slough National Wildlife Refuge
 Tomahawk Lake National Wildlife Refuge

Lakes

 Lake Ashtabula
 Eckelson Lake
 Fox Lake
 Goose Lake
 Hobart Lake
 Island Lake
 Kee Lake
 Lake Benson
 Meadow Lake
 Moon Lake
 Mud Lake
 Round Lake
 Saint Marys Lake
 Sanborn Lake
 Tomahawk Lake

Demographics

2000 census
As of the 2000 census there were 11,775 people, 4,884 households, and 3,115 families in the county. The population density was 8 people per square mile (3/km2). There were 5,599 housing units at an average density of 4 per square mile (1/km2). The racial makeup of the county was 97.91% White, 0.45% Black or African American, 0.76% Native American, 0.19% Asian, 0.12% from other races, and 0.57% from two or more races. 0.54% of the population were Hispanic or Latino of any race. 40.3% were of German and 34.0% Norwegian ancestry.

There were 4,884 households, out of which 27.40% had children under the age of 18 living with them, 53.90% were married couples living together, 6.80% had a female householder with no husband present, and 36.20% were non-families. 31.50% of all households were made up of individuals, and 15.90% had someone living alone who was 65 years of age or older. The average household size was 2.29 and the average family size was 2.89.

The county population contained 22.30% under the age of 18, 11.30% from 18 to 24, 23.00% from 25 to 44, 23.60% from 45 to 64, and 19.80% who were 65 years of age or older. The median age was 41 years. For every 100 females there were 96.80 males. For every 100 females age 18 and over, there were 95.40 males.

The median income for a household in the county was $31,166, and the median income for a family was $42,149. Males had a median income of $28,504 versus $18,447 for females. The per capita income for the county was $16,566.  About 6.40% of families and 10.80% of the population were below the poverty line, including 10.90% of those under age 18 and 10.90% of those age 65 or over.

2010 census
As of the 2010 census, there were 11,066 people, 4,826 households, and 2,927 families residing in the county. The racial makeup of the county was 96.4% white, 0.8% black or African American, 0.7% American Indian, 0.5% Asian, 0.2% from other races, and 1.4% from two or more races. Those of Hispanic or Latino origin made up 1.1% of the population. In terms of ancestry, 48.4% were German, 37.2% were Norwegian, 8.3% were Irish, 5.2% were English, and 2.7% were American.

Of the 4,826 households, 24.8% had children under the age of 18 living with them, 50.8% were married couples living together, 6.4% had a female householder with no husband present, 39.3% were non-families, and 32.9% of all households were made up of individuals. The average household size was 2.19 and the average family size was 2.79. The median age was 44.3 years.

The median income for a household in the county was $41,773 and the median income for a family was $59,558. Males had a median income of $42,575 versus $30,361 for females. The per capita income for the county was $26,152. About 6.4% of families and 12.0% of the population were below the poverty line, including 12.6% of those under age 18 and 14.6% of those age 65 or over.

Population by decade

Communities

Cities

 Dazey
 Fingal
 Kathryn
 Leal
 Litchville
 Nome
 Oriska
 Pillsbury
 Rogers
 Sanborn
 Sibley
 Tower City (part)
 Valley City (county seat)
 Wimbledon

Unincorporated communities

 Berea
 Cuba
 Daily
 Eastedge
 Eckelson
 Hastings
 Koldok
 Lucca
 North Valley City
 Urbana

Townships

 Alta
 Anderson
 Ashtabula
 Baldwin
 Binghampton
 Brimer
 Cuba
 Dazey
 Eckelson
 Edna
 Ellsbury
 Getchell
 Grand Prairie
 Green
 Greenland
 Hemen
 Hobart
 Lake Town
 Mansfield
 Marsh
 Meadow Lake
 Minnie Lake
 Nelson
 Noltimier
 Norma
 Oakhill
 Oriska
 Pierce
 Potter
 Raritan
 Rogers
 Rosebud
 Sibley Trail
 Skandia
 Spring Creek
 Springvale
 Stewart
 Svea
 Thordenskjold
 Uxbridge
 Valley
 Weimer

Notable people
 Frank White, eighth Governor of North Dakota and Treasurer of the United States.
 Peggy Lee, singer & actress
 Earl Pomeroy, U.S. Congressman
 Morley Nelson, conservationist

Politics
Barnes County voters have been reliably Republican for decades. In only one national election since 1936 has the county selected the Democratic County candidate.

Education
School districts:
 Barnes County North Public School District 7
 Enderlin Area Public School District 24
 Griggs County Central School District 18
 Hope-Page School District
 Litchville-Marion Public School District 46
 Maple Valley Public School District 4
 Montpelier Public School District 14
 Valley City Public School District 2

Former districts:
 Hope Public School District 10 - Consolidated with Page district in 2020
 Oriska School District - Consolidated into Maple Valley in 2003
 Page Public School District 80 - Consolidated with Hope district in 2020

See also
 National Register of Historic Places listings in Barnes County, North Dakota

References

External links
 Barnes County, North Dakota official website
 Barnes County maps, Sheet 1 (southern) and Sheet 2 (northern), North Dakota DOT

 
North Dakota counties
1879 establishments in Dakota Territory
Populated places established in 1879